Three Dog Night's original recordings were released by ABC Dunhill Records, except for 1983's It's A Jungle, which was released by Passport. In the mid-1970s, executives at ABC Dunhill discarded their multi-track recordings and mono masters to save storage space in a cost-cutting measure. As a result, all re-issues on CD were remastered using album masters.

Albums

Studio albums

Three Dog Night has confirmed they are working on their next album, which will be called The Road Ahead. It currently does not have a release date.

Live albums

Compilation albums

Singles

References

External Links
 

 
Discographies of American artists
Rock music group discographies